SMGS can refer to:

 Advanced Surface Movement Guidance and Control System or Surface Movement Guidance System
 Society for Medieval German Studies
  of the Organization for Cooperation of Railways

See also

 SMG5 protein
 
 
 SMG (disambiguation)